Juan Antonio Portela Muñoz (born 22 October 1984) is a Spanish footballer who plays as a left defender.

Club career
Born in Jerez de la Frontera, Province of Cádiz, Portela graduated from Xerez CD's youth system, making his senior debuts with the reserves in the regional championships. Also in the 2003–04 season he made his professional debut, coming on as a late substitute of a 0–1 away loss against Polideportivo Ejido on 19 June 2004, in the Segunda División. Portela continued to appear with the B-team in the following seasons, however.

On 3 June 2007 Portela returned to first-team duties, starting in a 0–0 away draw against Albacete Balompié. A month later he signed a new two-year deal with the Andalusians, but was released two seasons later.

In the following years Portela competed in Segunda División B, representing AD Ceuta, Écija Balompié, CD Puertollano and Atlético Sanluqueño CF.

References

External links

1984 births
Living people
Footballers from Jerez de la Frontera
Spanish footballers
Association football defenders
Segunda División players
Segunda División B players
Tercera División players
Xerez CD B players
Xerez CD footballers
AD Ceuta footballers
Écija Balompié players
CD Puertollano footballers
Atlético Sanluqueño CF players